Liberal Party (Japan) may refer to:
Liberal Party (Japan, 1881), formed by Itagaki Taisuke to promote a national assembly
Liberal Party (Japan, 1890), a merger including the Aikoku Kōtō, Daidō Club and Daidō Kyōwakai
Liberal Party (Japan, 1903), a breakaway from Rikken Seiyūkai by some National Diet members
Liberal Party (Japan, 1945), a conservative party led by Ichirō Hatoyama
Liberal Party (Japan, 1950), a merger including the Democratic Liberal Party
Liberal Party–Hatoyama (1953), led by Mamoru Shigemitsu
Liberal Party (Japan, 1998), formed by Ichirō Ozawa and Hirohisa Fujii
Liberal Party (Japan, 2016), formed in 2012 as the People's Life Party